Al Sajaa (also known as Al Saja'a) is a settlement in Sharjah, United Arab Emirates (UAE), located on the Sharjah/Dhaid highway and adjacent to the arterial Emirates Road (E611).

It is the location of a major industrial area as well as the planned 14 million square feet industrial zone, Al Sajaa Industrial Oasis (ASIO). Developed by Sharjah Asset Management Holding (SAM), the investment arm of the government of Sharjah, the zone aims to become the largest industrial area in the UAE. 

With an initial inventory of 353 development plots intended for use as industrial units, the size of plots in the zone's launch offering extended from 13,454 to 53,819 square feet. Plots include industrial, mixed use and retail units. The zone intends to capitalise on Sajaa's location close to Sharjah International Airport, the Al Hamriyah Port and Free Zone and the E611, which links the emirates on the west coast of the UAE.

References 

Populated places in the Emirate of Sharjah